Nepal Academy of Tourism and Hotel Management (NATHM) is a public hospitality college situated at Ravi Bhawan, Kathmandu. NATHM is operated by The Ministry of Culture, Tourism and Civil Aviation which offers four years bachelors in Travel & Tourism, Hotel Management and Masters in Hospitality Management.

History 
Nepal Academy of Tourism and Hotel Management (NATHM) was established in 1972 by the Government of Nepal as Hotel Management and Tourism Training Centre (HMTTC) with the support of UNDP and ILO. After including the Bachelor of Hotel Management (BHM) program for the first time in Nepal in 1999, HMTTC was renamed as NATHM. The academy then launched the Bachelor of Travel and Tourism Management (BTTM) program in 2003.

Academic programs 
 Bachelor of Travel and Tourism Management (BTTM)
 Bachelor In Hotel Management (BHM)
 Masters In Hospitality Management (MHM)
Tourist Guide Training
Trekking Guide Training
Liaison officer Training

Branches 
NATHM has expanded its branches in 3 places of Nepal. 

NATHM has expanded it's branch in Birtamode, Jhapa, Banke of Lumbini province and Mahottari of province 2.

Photo Gallery

References 

Universities and colleges in Nepal
1972 establishments in Nepal